Ċirkewwa is a harbour situated in the northernmost point of Malta.

It is the site of the Ċirkewwa Ferry Terminal, where regular car ferries operate to the port of Mġarr in Gozo. In the summer, boat trips to Comino also operate, as well as organised diving excursions. As Ċirkewwa is a point on the northernmost end of the island, and not a town, there is no major infrastructure besides the terminal. 

Visitors travelling to Gozo can reach Ċirkewwa by car by following road signs to Gozo, and by bus from Valletta, Sliema, Buġibba and St. Paul's Bay.

Near the harbour there is a hotel and Paradise Bay, a sandy beach.

Diving in Ċirkewwa

Ċirkewwa is one of the most visited scuba diving sites on the Maltese Islands. It has underwater cliffs, caves, tunnels and an arch down to the seabed at 27m. Ċirkewwa also includes the wrecks of the tugboat MV Rozi and the P29 patrol boat, which were intentionally sunk in 1992 and 2007 respectively. Out towards Marfa Point is a statue of the Virgin Mary which was placed in a natural cavern by the Amphibians Diving Club.

From the middle of 2010, divers have been cooperating to designate Ċirkewwa as a Voluntary Marine Reserve. The site now has the support of the diving community which is working to gain the support of the fishing, angling and boating communities to implement a code of conduct to preserve and protect the site.

References

External links

 Gozo Channel Company Limited
 Malta Amphibians Dive club
 Cirkewwa Voluntary Marine Reserve

Coordinates: 

Geography of Malta
Underwater diving sites in Malta
Mellieħa
Ports and harbours of Malta